Most powerful production cars in the world. This list is limited to unmodified production cars which meet the eligibility criteria below. All entries must verified from reliable sources.

Eligible cars 

Because of inconsistencies in the definitions of production cars, dubious claims by manufacturers and self-interest groups, and inconsistent or changing application of definitions, this list has a defined set of requirements. For explanation of how these were determined, see the links above.

For the purposes of this list, a production car is defined as a vehicle that conforms to at least one of the following two definitions:

(A.)

 Constructed principally for retail sale to consumers for their personal use, and to transport people on public roads (no commercial or industrial vehicles are eligible)
 Had 25 or more instances made by the original vehicle manufacturer and offered for commercial sale to the public in new condition (cars modified by either professional tuners or individuals are not eligible)
 Street-legal in their intended markets and capable of passing any official tests or inspections required to be granted this status

(B.)

Constructed principally for retail sale to consumers, for their personal use, to transport people on public roads (no commercial or industrial vehicles are eligible)
 Available for commercial sale to the public in the same specification as the vehicle used to achieve the record
 Manufactured in the record-claiming specification by a manufacturer whose WMI number is shown on the VIN, including vehicles modified by either professional tuners or others that result in a VIN with a WMI number in their name (for example, if a Porsche-based car is remanufactured by RUF and has RUF's WMI W09, it is eligible; but if it has Porsche's WMI, WP0, it is not eligible)
 Pre-1981 vehicles must be made by the original vehicle manufacturer and not modified by either professional tuners or individuals
 Street-legal in its intended markets, having fulfilled the homologation tests or inspections required under either a) United States of America, b) European Union, or c) Japanese law to be granted this status
 Sold in more than one national market

Further limitations 
For the purpose of manageability, this list is limited to production cars that have at least 600 kilowatts. Car models with higher-powered variants are listed only in their most powerful incarnation (for example, the Agera RS would be listed in place of the standard Agera, although the Agera makes over 600 kW). For the timeline of most powerful cars, the production car definition is only applied to modern (post-WWII) cars due to the scarcity of reliable info on Veteran and Vintage era automobiles.

Most powerful production cars

Timeline of most powerful production cars

See also 

 Engine power
 List of fastest production cars by acceleration
 List of production cars by specific power
 Production car speed record
 List of automotive superlatives

References

Car performance
Horsepower
Car-related lists